Hatti is a census town in Raichur district in the Indian state of Karnataka. This town is located near Lingsugur taluk, 20 km from Lingsugur. Hatti is famous for gold mining; the area surrounding the gold mines is incorporated as a separate town, the Hatti Gold Mines notified area council.

 the 2011 Census of India, Hatti had a population of 16,278 across 2,759 households. There were 8,216 males (50.4%) and 8,062 females (49.6%). 10,066 (61%) of people were literate. 2,155 (13%) were under the age of 6.

References

Cities and towns in Raichur district